The Ivan Franko Museum is a museum dedicated to Ukrainian writer and poet Ivan Franko (1856–1916)  in Winnipeg, Manitoba, Canada.

The museum operates primarily through the efforts of volunteers and relies on the support of people for its financial support. Entrance to the museum has always been free.

References

External links 

 Association of Manitoba Museums: Ivan Franko Museum
Ivan Franko Museum
Association of Manitoba Museums: Ivan Franko Museum

Museums in Winnipeg
Franko, Ivan
Ukrainian museums in Canada
Literary museums in Canada
Poetry museums
Ivan Franko